A tuna is a fish from the family Scombridae which is heavily fished commercially.

Tuna may also refer to:

Fiction
 Charlie the Tuna, corporate mascot
 Tuna, comics character Tsuna Sawada
 Tuna, a drug dealer in Blow (film)
 A nickname for Jim Halpert in U.S. television series The Office

Music
 Hot Tuna, an American rock band
"Tuna 1613", a song on the Therion album Gothic Kabbalah 
Tuna (music), a music group made up of university students from Iberia or Latin America
Tuna (singer), a Macedonian-Albanian singer and songwriter
Tuna (rapper), an Israeli rapper and actor

Places
 Tuna, a village in McKean County, Pennsylvania
 Tuna, Iran, a village in Lorestan Province, Iran
 Tuna, Vimmerby, a village in Sweden
 Tuna, Nyköping, a parish in Sweden centred in Enstaberga
 Tuna Court District, a district of Medelpad in Sweden
 Tuna Grand Court District, a district of Dalarna in Sweden
 Tuna Port, a port in Kutch, India
 Tuna, San Germán, Puerto Rico, a barrio
 Tuna, Turkish name for the Danube River

Ships
 , more than one ship of the British Royal Navy
 , more than one United States Navy ship

Other uses
 S.V. Tuna, a Surinamese association football club
 Tuna (name), a given name and a family name (including lists of persons with the name)
 Tuna (Polynesian mythology), a god
 TUNA, Transurethral needle ablation of the prostate
 Tuna, the Māori word for the New Zealand longfin eel
 Tuna, the pre-release codename for the Galaxy Nexus smart phone
 Tuna, Spanish for prickly pear, the fruit of the Opuntia cacti
 Tunalikevirus, a genus of viruses whose type species is Enterobacteria phage T1 (T-un)

See also
 Chali 2na, an M.C. and rap artist
 Tuner (disambiguation)
 Tunny (disambiguation), words related to another name for Tuna
 Las Tunas (disambiguation)
 Las Tunas (city), Cuban city
 Las Tunas Province, Cuban province
 White tuna (disambiguation)
 Greater Tuna, off-Broadway play about fictional Tuna, Texas